The 2011–12 season is the 102nd season of competitive football in Germany.

Diary of the season 
15 July 2011 – The professional season begins with the first matchday of the 2. Bundesliga season.
29 July–1 August 2011 – The first matches in the DFB-Pokal are played, resulting in the elimination of two Bundesliga clubs. VfL Wolfsburg lose 3–2 against Regionalliga club RB Leipzig, and SC Freiburg lose to 3. Liga club SpVgg Unterhaching by the same score.
5 August 2011 – The Bundesliga season starts with a match between Borussia Dortmund and Hamburger SV. The defending champions win the match 3–1.
13 September 2011 – In last place in the 2. Bundesliga, Alemannia Aachen sacks manager Peter Hyballa. Hyballa had taken the reins in Aachen at the beginning of the previous season.
14 September 2011 – Just one spot ahead of Aachen, VfL Bochum relieves Friedhelm Funkel from his duties as manager. Like Hyballa in Aachen, Funkel had started as manager in Bochum at the beginning of the previous season following the club's relegation from the top flight. Former FC St. Pauli and Hannover 96 manager Andreas Bergmann is hired the following day to fill the vacancy.
19 September 2011 – Four days after being sacked in Bochu, Friedhelm Funkel takes over the vacant manager's position at Alemannia Aachen.
19 September 2011 – At risk of being relegated from the top flight for the first time in the club's history, Hamburger SV sacks manager Michael Oenning. Originally signed as assistant manager, Oenning had taken the manager's position following the sacking of Armin Veh six months prior. Rodolfo Cardoso, manager of the HSV reserves, takes over as caretaker.
22 September 2011 – Suffering from burnout, Ralf Rangnick resigns as manager of FC Schalke 04. Rangnick's six months in charge of Schalke, following the sacking of Felix Magath, included a victory in the 2011 DFB-Pokal Final.
27 September 2011 – In his second stint at Schalke, Dutchmen Huub Stevens fills the managerial post vacated by Ralf Rangnick. In addition to having managed Schalke over the turn of the millennium, Stevens previous engagements in Germany include Hertha BSC, 1. FC Köln, and Hamburger SV.
13 October 2011 – After sport director Frank Arnesen took over from Rodolf Cardoso for a week, Thorsten Fink transfers from FC Basel to take over as manager of Hamburger SV. Fink had won the Swiss Super League with Basel the previous season.
28 October 2011 – Having won only one of the previous six matches in the 2. Bundesliga, then losing the second round of the DFB-Pokal to Regionalliga club Holstein Kiel, MSV Duisburg sacks Milan Šašić as manager. Šašić had led the club to a cup final the previous season. Goalkeeping coach Oliver Reck replaces him on the bench.
31 October 2011 – Rainer Scharinger loses his job as Karlsruher SC manager, following a ten-game winless streak. Scharinger had assumed the post in March 2011, and managed the club clear of relegation in the previous season.
6 November 2011 – Norwegian manager Jørn Andersen returns to Germany to take the reins at Karlsruher SC. Andersen had previously managed Rot-Weiß Oberhausen, Kickers Offenbach, and had led 1. FSV Mainz 05 to promotion to the Bundesliga. Most recently, he managed Greek Super League club AEL Larissa.
9 November 2011 – In dead last in the 2. Bundesliga, FC Ingolstadt 04 sacks manager Benno Möhlmann. Möhlmann was hired as manager almost exactly one year prior. The following day, former FSV Frankfurt manager Tomas Oral was hired to replace him.
6 December 2011 – Having lost four of the six previous games, drawing the other two, F.C. Hansa Rostock sacks Peter Vollmann as manager. Hansa had won promotion to the 2nd division under Vollmann the previous season. The following day, Hansa hired Wolfgang Wolf to fill the post. Wolf has Bundesliga experience, having managed VfL Wolfsburg, 1. FC Nürnberg, and 1. FC Kaiserslautern in the top flight.
8 December 2011 – By mutual consent, Energie Cottbus and Claus-Dieter Wollitz dissolve their contract. Wollitz had managed Cottbus in the two previous seasons.
17 December 2011 – Following a nine-match winless streak, FSV Frankfurt sacks Hans-Jürgen Boysen. Boysen had been manager of FSV Frankfurt for two years, avoiding relegation with the club twice.
18 December 2011 – With two matches left to play before the break, Hertha BSC sacks manager Markus Babbel. The club made it clear that this was due to internal disputes and not the club's poor showing in the league. Babbel had taken charge at Hertha at the beginning of the previous season, and led the club to promotion back to the top flight.
21 December 2011 – FSV Frankfurt hires Benno Möhlmann as manager. Möhlmann had previously held several managerial posts in the Bundesliga and 2. Bundesliga, and had been sacked as manager of FC Ingolstadt 04 just six weeks prior.
22 December 2011 – Having played the remaining games before the break under interim manager Rainer Widmayer, Hertha BSC announces Michael Skibbe has been hired to fill the vacant managerial post. His playing career having been cut-short by injury, Skibbe had been the youngest ever manager of a Bundesliga club.
29 December 2011 – Going into the winter break in last place in the Bundesliga, SC Freiburg replaces manager Marcus Sorg with assistant manager Christian Streich. Sorg had been assistant manager under Robin Dutt, and replaced him as manager when he left the club at the beginning of the season. For Streich, it would be his first managerial post.
9 February 2012 – Having won only two of the previous ten matches, 1899 Hoffenheim sacks Holger Stanislawski as manager. Stanislawski had taken over the club at the beginning of the season following five years at FC St. Pauli which included a promotion to the Bundesliga.
10 February 2012 – 1899 Hoffenheim hire Markus Babbel to fill the vacant manager's post. Babbel had been sacked by Hertha BSC just six weeks prior. His previous accomplishments include winning promotion to the Bundesliga in Berlin, and qualifying for the UEFA Champions League with VfB Stuttgart.
12 February 2012 – After five losses in as many matches, Hertha BSC sacks Michael Skibbe, who had taken over the club over the winter break.
18 February 2012 – Hertha BSC hire Otto Rehhagel as manager. Rehhagel had played for Hertha in the first ever Bundesliga season. More recently, he had led the Greek national team to a title at UEFA Euro 2004.
21 February 2012 – At risk of being relegated to the 3. Liga, FC Erzgebirge Aue sacks Rico Schmitt. It had been Schmitt's first professional managerial post, which had held since 2009. The following day, the club hires Karsten Baumann, who had previously managed VfL Osnabrück in the 2. Bundesliga, to replace Schmitt.
20 March 2012 – Having not won a single league match since November, 1. FC Kaiserslautern sacks manager Marco Kurz. Kurz had assumed the post at the beginning of the 2009–10 season, and led the club to promotion to the Bundesliga that year.
22 March 2012 – 1. FC Kaiserslautern announce the signing of Krasimir Balakov as manager, to replace Marco Kurz. Balakov had previously managed professional clubs in Switzerland, Croatia, and his native Bulgaria.
26 March 2012 – Second to last in the 2. Bundesliga and at risk of relegation, Karlsruher SC sacks Jørn Andersen as manager. The Norwegian got the job five months earlier. Reserve manager Markus Kauczinski takes over the post.
1 April 2012 – In sixth place and likely to miss the goal of qualifying for the UEFA Champions League, Bayer Leverkusen sack Robin Dutt as manager. Dutt had taken the reins in Leverkusen at the beginning of the season after Jupp Heynckes transferred to Bayern Munich. Sami Hyypiä, manager of the Finish national team, is hired to manage the club until the end of the season. Hyypiä had ended his playing career, playing for Leverkusen, at the end of the previous season.
1 April 2012 – Having fallen to 17th place in the 2. Bundesliga after losing five consecutive matches, Alemannia Aachen sacks Friedhelm Funkel. For Aachen, this was the second time they had sacked a manager this season, and for Funkel, the second time he had been sacked as manager.
12 April 2012 – 1. FC Köln sack manager Ståle Solbakken. For Solbakken, who had taken over in Cologne at the beginning of the season, this was his first managerial stint in Germany. Former manager Frank Schaefer is rehired to fill the vacancy.

Men's national team
The home team is on the left column; the away team is on the right column.

Friendly matches

Euro 2012 qualifying

The German men's national team were drawn into UEFA Euro 2012 qualifying Group A.

All fixtures for this group were negotiated between the participants at a meeting in Frankfurt, Germany on 21 and 22 February 2010.

UEFA Euro 2012

Group stage

Knockout stage

Women's national team
The home team is on the left column; the away team is on the right column.

Euro 2013 qualifying

2012 Algarve Cup

Friendly match

League season

Bundesliga

2. Bundesliga

3. Liga

Bundesliga (women)

2. Bundesliga (women)

German clubs in Europe

UEFA Champions League

Play-off round

Group stage

Group A

Group E

Group F

Knockout phase

Round of 16

Quarter-finals

Semi-finals

Final

UEFA Europa League

Qualifying phase

Third qualifying round

Play-off round

Group stage

Group B

Group J

Knockout phase

Round of 32

Round of 16

Quarter-finals

UEFA Women's Champions League

Round of 32

|}

Round of 16

|}

Quarter-finals

|}

Semi-finals

|}

Final

Transfer deals

Retirements 
Tomasz Bobel – 36, Polish goalkeeper for Fortuna Köln, MSV Duisburg, Erzgebirge Aue, and Bayer 04 Leverkusen. Bobel began his career in Poland before joining Fortuna Köln. In 2009, he had a brief stint in Azerbaijan, playing for Neftchi Baku, before returning to Germany as a backup to René Adler.
Pál Dárdai – 35, Hungarian midfielder for Hertha BSC. Beginning his career for in Hungary, Dardai played over a decade for Hertha BSC.
Ivica Grlić – 35, Bosnian midfielder, for TSV 1860 München, Fortuna Köln, 1. FC Köln, Alemannia Aachen, and MSV Duisburg. Born in Munich, Grlić earned 26 international caps for Bosnia over the course of his career. He captained MSV Duisburg until 2008, when he missed several consecutive games due to injury.
Mathias Hain – 38, German goalkeeper for SpVgg Greuther Fürth, Arminia Bielefeld, and FC St. Pauli. Long serving captain of Arminia Bielefeld, Hain was forced to retire after breaking his arm.
Sami Hyypiä – 37, Finnish defender for Bayer 04 Leverkusen. Beginning his career in Finland for MYPA, Hyypiä played in the Netherlands for Willem II and in England for Liverpool before coming to Germany.
Jean-Sébastien Jaurès – 33, French defender for Borussia Mönchengladbach. Before his three seasons in the Bundesliga, Jaurès had played his entire career for AJ Auxerre.
Tomasz Kos – 37, Polish midfielder for FC Gütersloh, 1. FC Nürnberg, and FC Erzgebirge Aue. Kos captained Erzgebirge Aue, and earned three international caps over the course of his career.
Martin Pieckenhagen – 39, German goalkeeper for 1. FC Union Berlin, Tennis Borussia Berlin, MSV Duisburg, Hansa Rostock, Hamburger SV, and 1. FSV Mainz 05. In addition to the German clubs, he played five season in the Netherlands for Heracles Almelo.

Deaths 
 13 December 2011 – Klaus-Dieter Sieloff, 69, defender for VfB Stuttgart and Borussia Mönchengladbach, among others.  Member of 1966 and 1970 West Germany world cup squads.
 3 January 2012 – Willi Entenmann, 68, player for VfB Stuttgart and others.  He also was manager for Stuttgart and 1. FC Nürnberg among others.
 1 March 2012 – Henryk Bałuszyński, 39, striker for VfL Bochum and Arminia Bielefeld, among others. From 1994 to 1997, he earned 15 international caps for the Polish national team.
 12 March 2012 – Friedhelm Konietzka, 73, striker for Borussia Dortmund and TSV 1860 München. Following his career as a player, Konietzka managed Borussia Dortmund, Bayer Uerdingen, Hessen Kassel, and several Swiss clubs, winning the Swiss championship three times.
 12 April 2012 – Manfred Orzessek, 78, goalkeeper for FC Schalke 04 and Borussia Mönchengladbach. Orzessek won the German championship with Schalke in 1958, and was the starting goalkeeper of the Mönchengladbach side that won promotion to the Bundesliga in 1965.

References

 
German
Seasons in German football